Théo Fabrício Nery Lopes (born 31 August 1983) is a Brazilian male volleyball player who plays for Portuguese club S.L. Benfica. He was part of the Brazil national team who won the 2010 FIVB World Championship in Italy.

Honours
Benfica
Portuguese First Division: 2018–19
Portuguese Cup: 2018–19
Portuguese Super Cup: 2018, 2019

References

External links
 Théo Lopes at the International Volleyball Federation
 
  Theo Fabricio Nery Lopes at WorldofVolley

1983 births
Living people
Place of birth missing (living people)
Brazilian men's volleyball players
S.L. Benfica volleyball players
Universiade silver medalists for Brazil
Universiade medalists in volleyball
Opposite hitters
Sportspeople from Brasília